Maxville is a census-designated place in Granite County, Montana, United States. Its population was 130 as of the 2010 census. Montana Highway 1 passes through the community. It is 11 miles from Philipsburg.

Geography

Demographics

References

Census-designated places in Montana
Census-designated places in Granite County, Montana
Unincorporated communities in Granite County, Montana
Unincorporated communities in Montana